This is a partial list of massacres in the United States; death tolls may be approximate.

For single-perpetrator events and shooting sprees, see List of rampage killers in the United States, Mass shootings in the United States, :Category:Spree shootings in the United States, and :Category:Mass shootings in the United States by year
For Indian massacres, see Indian massacres.

List

See also
 List of ethnic riots#United States
 List of incidents of civil unrest in the United States
 List of rampage killers (school massacres)
 List of school massacres by death toll
 Mass racial violence in the United States
 Murder of workers in labor disputes in the United States

References 

United States
Massacres

Massacres
massacre
United States crime-related lists